Phillip Avenue is a light rail station in Australia on the Canberra Metro R1 Civic to Gungahlin line, located on the Federal Highway at the intersection of Phillip Avenue. The station primarily serves the suburb of Watson although it is close to Exhibition Park in Canberra and a few businesses in the northern part of Lyneham, providing an alternative to the EPIC and Racecourse station during major events. Bicycle racks are provided for commuters adjacent to the station, but there is no dedicated parking or "kiss and ride" bays available.

Light rail services
All services in both directions stop at the station. Although the station is not a major interchange, transfer to local ACTION bus route 18 is possible here.

References

Light rail stations in Canberra
Railway stations in Australia opened in 2019